Federal Highway 129 (Carretera Federal 129) is a Federal Highway of Mexico. The highway travels from Nautla, Veracruz in the northeast to Amozoc de Mota, Puebla in the southwest.

References

129